Ikan Tanda was a Japanese built cargo carrier which ran aground off the coast of Cape Town, South Africa, in 2001.

History

The Ikan Tanda was completed in 1979 as the Amazon by Ishikawajima Kure of Japan.  The 17,800 DWT vessel was later sold to PACC Ship Managers Pte. Ltd. of Singapore.

Wreck

On 5 September 2001, the ship suffered a fire in its engine room and suffered a loss of power about 40 km from Cape Town, South Africa.  This normally would not have been a severe problem; however, the ship was in a major storm at the time and began drifting toward land.  The ship drifted for 3 hours until it was in shallow enough water to drop anchor, but the  seas and 50-knot winds overpowered the anchors and drove the vessel aground near the Slangkop lighthouse.

Salvaging efforts
The crew of the Ikan Tanda were rescued by Oryx helicopters of the South African Air Force (SAAF), and a salvage tug, the John Ross, was dispatched to aid in the recovery of the ship.  Ultimately, the ship was re-floated, but was scuttled 200 miles west of Cape Town.

References

Bulk carriers
Shipwrecks of the South African Atlantic coast
1978 ships
Maritime incidents in 2001